In cartography, a Styled Layer Descriptor (SLD) is an XML schema specified by the Open Geospatial Consortium (OGC) for describing the appearance of map layers. It is capable of describing the rendering of vector and raster data. A typical use of SLDs is to instruct a Web Map Service (WMS) how to render a specific layer. 

In August 2007 the OGC split an older SLD specification into two new OGC implementation specifications:
 Symbology Encoding (SE)
 Styled Layer Descriptor (SLD)

The Styled Layer Descriptor specification now only contains the protocol for communicating with a WMS about how to style a layer. The actual description of the styling is now exclusively described in the symbology encoding implementation specification.

SLD-supporting software

Open source 

Desktop software:
 OpenJUMP
 uDig
 AtlasStyler SLD editor
 Gaia
 QGIS
 SLD Editor

Server-side software:
 deegree
 GeoServer
 MapServer
 Geomajas

Proprietary 

Server-side software:
 Esri ArcGIS Server
 Ecere's GNOSIS Map Server

Client-side software:
 Ecere's GNOSIS Cartographer

See also 
 UDig
 GeoServer

References

External links
 OpenGIS Styled Layer Descriptor Implementation Specification
 OpenGIS Symbology Encoding Implementation Specification
 AtlasStyler SLD Editor is a free-software (LGPL) SLD Editor developed with GeoTools + Java + Swing.
 SLD Cookbook, a collection of simple SLD code samples, part of the GeoServer User Manual.

Cartography
XML
Open Geospatial Consortium